The following is a list of squads for each nation competing at the 2008 FIFA U-17 Women's World Cup in New Zealand. The tournament started on 28 October and the final took place in Auckland on 16 November 2008.

Each nation had to submit a squad of 21 players, three of which had to be goalkeepers, for the tournament.

Ages as of 28 October 2008.

Group A

Canada
Head coach: Bryan Rosenfeld

Colombia
Head coach: Pedro Rodríguez

Denmark
Head coach: Bent Eriksen

New Zealand
Head coach: Paul Temple

Group B

Costa Rica
Head coach: Juan Quesada

Germany
Head coach: Ralf Peter

Ghana
Head coach: Abraham Allotey

North Korea
Head coach: Ri Ui-ham

Group C

France
Head coach: Gerard Sergent

Japan
Head coach: Hiroshi Yoshida

Paraguay
Head coach: Carlos Báez

United States
Head coach: Kazbek Tambi

Group D

Brazil
Head coach: Marcos Gaspar

England
Head coach: Lois Fidler

South Korea
Head coach: Kim Yong Ho

Nigeria
Head coach: Felix Ibe Ukwu

References
 

FIFA U-17 Women's World Cup squads
2008 in youth association football